National Soccer Stadium may refer to:

BMO Field, Toronto, Canada 
National Soccer Stadium (Samoa), in Apia